The Duchy of Limburg was a European polity created in 1839 from parts of the Dutch Province of Limburg as a result of the Treaty of London. Its territory was the part of Limburg that remained Dutch (the western half having become Belgian), with the exceptions of the cities of Maastricht and Venlo. The duchy was simultaneously a province of the Kingdom of the Netherlands and a member of the German Confederation.

History

Establishment
The German Confederation, as established by the Congress of Vienna in 1815, was a loose association of 39 German states to coordinate the economies of the member countries. Its main achievement was the creation of the customs union as developed during 1818 and 1834, which provided a common economic market for its member states. Though not a part of the German Confederation at its founding, Limburg would join it in 1839 as a consequence of the Belgian Revolution. In 1830 several francophone, Catholic and liberal groups joined forces and proclaimed the independence of Belgium, whose territory prior to that had been part of the Netherlands.

In the subsequent peace settlement in 1839, the Dutch King ceded the western half of the Grand Duchy of Luxembourg to the newly formed Belgian state. Luxembourg however, had been a member state of the German Confederation since the latter's creation and with the annexation of its western parts lost approximately 150,000 inhabitants. The German Confederation insisted the common market of the customs union would be compensated by the Netherlands elsewhere; the Dutch thus created the Duchy of Limburg (consisting of the Province of Limburg minus its two major cities, Maastricht and Venlo, so as to not exceed the 150,000 number).

Dissolution and aftermath

The Seven Weeks' War between Austria and Prussia in 1866 led to the collapse of the German Confederation. To clarify the position of the Grand Duchy of Luxembourg and the Duchy of Limburg, which were possessions of the Dutch King but also been member states of the Confederation, the Second Treaty of London in 1867 affirmed that Limburg was an "integral part of the Kingdom of the Netherlands", while Luxembourg was and had been an independent state in personal union with the Kingdom of the Netherlands since 1839.

The style "Duchy of Limburg" continued to be used in some official capacities until February 1907. An idiosyncrasy that survives to this day is that the King's Commissioner for the province is still informally addressed as "Governor" in Limburg, although his formal style does not differ from that used in other provinces.

See also 
 Province of Limburg (1815–1839)

References

External links
 History of Limburg during the German Confederation Website of the History of the Netherlands by historian Dr. J. W. Swaen.
 

1839 establishments in Europe
1867 disestablishments in Europe
Limburg
States and territories established in 1839
Limburg (region)
History of Limburg (Netherlands)
German revolutions of 1848–1849
States and territories disestablished in 1867